Olynthus ( Olynthos, named for the ὄλυνθος olunthos, "the fruit of the wild fig tree") was an ancient city of Chalcidice, built mostly on two flat-topped hills 30–40m in height, in a fertile plain at the head of the Gulf of Torone, near the neck of the peninsula of Pallene, about 2.5 kilometers from the sea, and about 60 stadia (c. 9–10 kilometers) from Poteidaea. Artefacts found during the excavations of the site are exhibited in the Archaeological Museum of Olynthos.

History 
Olynthus, son of Heracles, or the river god Strymon, was considered the mythological founder of the town. The South Hill bore a small Neolithic settlement; was abandoned during the Bronze Age; and was resettled in the 7th century BC. Subsequently, the town was captured by the Bottiaeans, a Thracian tribe ejected from Macedon by Alexander I.

Following the Persian defeat at Salamis (480 BC) and with Xerxes having been escorted to the Hellespont by his general Artabazus, the Persian army spent the winter of the same year in Thessaly and Macedonia. The Persian authority in the Balkans must have significantly decreased at the time, which encouraged the inhabitants of the Pallene peninsula to break away. Suspecting that a revolt against the Great King was meditated, in order to control the situation, Artabazus captured Olynthus, which was thought to be disloyal, and killed its inhabitants. The town had priorly been given to Kritovoulos from Toroni and to a fresh population consisting of Greeks from the neighboring region of Chalcidice, who had been exiled by the Macedonians (Herod. viii. 127). Though Herodotus reports that Artabazus slaughtered them, Boetiaeans continued to live in the area.

Olynthus became a Greek polis, but it remained insignificant (in the quota-lists of the Delian League it appears as paying on the average 2 talents, as compared with 6 to 15 paid by Scione, 6 to 15 by Mende, 6 to 12 by Toroni, and 3 to 6 by Sermylia from 454 to 432).

In 432 King Perdiccas II of Macedon encouraged several nearby coastal towns to disband and remove their population to Olynthus, preparatory to a revolt to be led by Potidaea against Athens (Thuc. 1.58). This synoecism (συνοικισμός) was effected, though against Perdiccas's wishes the contributing cities were preserved.  This increase in population led to the settlement of the North Hill, which was developed on a Hippodamian grid plan.  In 423 Olynthus became the head of a formal Chalkidian League, occasioned by the synoecism or by the beginning of the Peloponnesian War and fear of Athenian attack.  During the Peloponnesian war it formed a base for Brasidas in his expedition of 424 and refuge for the citizens of Mende and Poteidaea that had rebelled against the Athenians (Thu. ii, 70).

After the end of the Peloponnesian War the development of the league was rapid and ended consisting of 32 cities. About 393 we find it concluding an important treaty with Amyntas III of Macedon (the father of Philip II), and by 382 it had absorbed most of the Greek cities west of the Strymon, and had even got possession of Pella, the chief city in Macedon. (Xenophon, Hell. V. 2, 12).

In this year Sparta was induced by an embassy from Acanthus and Apollonia, which anticipated conquest by the league, to send an expedition against Olynthus. After three years of indecisive warfare Olynthus consented to dissolve the confederacy (379).  It is clear, however, that the dissolution was little more than formal, as the Chalcidians ("Χαλκιδῆς ἀπò Θρᾴκης") appear, only a year or two later, among the members of the Athenian naval confederacy of 378–377.  Twenty years later, in the reign of Philip, the power of Olynthus is asserted by Demosthenes to have been much greater than before the Spartan expedition.  The town itself at this period is spoken of as a city of the first rank (πóλις μuρἰανδρος), and the league included thirty-two cities.

When the Social War broke out between Athens and its allies (357), Olynthus was at first in alliance with Philip. Subsequently, in alarm at the growth of his power, it concluded an alliance with Athens. Olynthus made three embassies to Athens, the occasions of Demosthenes's three Olynthiac Orations.  On the third, the Athenians sent soldiers from among its citizens.  After Philip had deprived Olynthus of the rest of the League, by force and by the treachery of sympathetic factions, he besieged Olynthus in 348.  The siege was short; he bought Olynthus's two principal citizens, Euthycrates and Lasthenes, who betrayed the city to him. He then looted and razed the city and sold its population—including the Athenian garrison—into slavery. According to the latest researches only a small area of the North Hill was ever re-occupied, up to 318, before Cassander forced the population to move in his new city of Cassandreia.

Though the city was extinguished, through subsequent centuries there would be men scattered through the Hellenistic world who were called Olynthians.

Topography and archaeology

The city of Olynthus lies in the hill named Megale Toumba near the village of Myriophyto. The probable site of Olynthus was identified as early as 1902. Between 1914 and 1916 plans were made for an excavation by the British School at Athens, but these fell through.

The ancient city extends over two hills that detach from a small coulee and possess an area ca. 1500 m long and 400 m in width. Excavations began in 1928. Prof. David Moore Robinson of Johns Hopkins University, under the American School of Classical Studies at Athens, conducted four seasons of work: in 1928, 1931, 1934, and 1939. The results of the excavations were digested into fourteen folio volumes, that were ultimately found to be the plagiarized work of another excavator, Mary Ross Ellingson. The excavation had uncovered more than five hectares of Olynthus and a portion of Mecyberna (the harbor of Olynthus).  On the North Hill this hurried pace proved relatively harmless due to the simple stratigraphy of an area of the city occupied only for 84 years and subjected to a sudden, final destruction; but the data from the South Hill was badly muddled.  Nonetheless, the work was excellent for its time, and remains supremely valuable. Much of the stratigraphy of the North Hill has been reconstructed by Nicholas Cahill (University of Wisconsin). The site is now in the charge of Dr. Julia Vokotopoulou, and the XVI Ephorate of Classical Antiquities.

The Neolithic settlement is located in the edge of the southern hill and was dated in the 3rd millennium BC. The houses were built by stone blocks and had one or two rooms. The pottery that was found was the typical of that period comprising monochrome ceramic vases. The end of this rural settlement was abrupt and is placed around the 1st millennium.

The archaic city was built under a provincially urban plan and extended throughout the whole south hill. Two avenues were revealed along the eastern and western edges of the hill that intersected with crossing streets. Along the south avenue shops and small houses were found while the administrative part was located in the north part of the hill, where the agora and a deanery were found.

The classical city was established on the much larger north hill and to its eastern slope. The excavations, which cover only 1/10 of the city's total area, have revealed a Hippodamian grid plan. Two large avenues were discovered, with an amplitude of 7 meters, along with vertical and horizontal streets that divided the urban area into city blocks. Each one had ten houses with two floors and a paved yard. Very important for the archaeological research are considered the rich villas that were excavated in the aristocratic suburb of the city located in the eastern part of the north hill since there was found some of the earliest floor mosaics in Greek art.

Both the archaic and classical city were protected by an extended land wall. Parts of the foundations of the wall were revealed in the north hill and elsewhere, but they are not enlightening on which method was followed for their construction. Archaeologists suppose that it was built with sun-dried bricks with a stone base, but it's difficult to tell, since the city was literally leveled by Phillip.

As it concerns the public buildings, the agora is placed in the south edge of the north hill, near the eastern gate, along with a public fountain, an arsenal and the city's parliament building (Βουλευτήριον). There is a small museum featuring artifacts recovered from Olynthus, and the whole archaeological site is open to public tours during daylight hours.

Notable people 
Callisthenes (c. 360-328 BC), historian
Ephippus (4th century BC), historian
Euphantus (4th century BC), philosopher
Sthennis (4th century BC), sculptor
Stratis, an ancient Greek historian
Jesse Papargiris (1985), accountant

Modern Olynthos 
The modern city, formerly Myriophyto, now called Olynthos or Nea Olynthos, sits on a small plateau on the western side of the river Olynthios or Resetenikia (in ancient times known as Sandanus), across from the ruins of the ancient city.

See also 
 List of ancient Greek cities

Notes

References 
 
 Liddell & Scott, Greek-English Lexicon. (1889/1996). Oxford: Clarendon Press.
 George Grote, A History of Greece, London, 1862.  74–108.
 Charles Rollin, Ancient History. (1844) Philadelphia: John B. Perry.
 Nicholas Cahill, Household and City Organization at Olynthus; Olynthus at Perseus
 Raymond Dessy, Exile from Olynthus.
 1929–1952. David M Robinson; George E Mylonas. Excavations at Olynthus. (Johns Hopkins University studies in archaeology, no. 6, 9, 11–12, 18–20, 25–26, 31–32, 36, 38–39.) 14 v. Baltimore: Johns Hopkins University Press. WorldCat

Sources 
 
 The chief passages in ancient literature are the Olynthiac Orations of Demosthenes, and Xenophon, Hell. v. 2.

External links

 Official website

Cities in ancient Macedonia
Greek colonies in Chalcidice
Ancient Greek archaeological sites in Central Macedonia
Former populated places in Greece
Members of the Delian League
Bottiaea
Populated places in ancient Macedonia
Populated places in Chalkidiki